The 1989 Soviet Chess Championship was the 56th edition of USSR Chess Championship. Held from 23 September 15 October 1989 in Odessa. The title was won by Rafael Vaganian. Semifinals took place at Barnaul, Blagoveshchensk and Uzhhorod; two First League tournaments (qualifying to the final) were held at Klaipeda and Simferopol.

Qualifying

Semifinals 
Semifinals took place at Barnaul, Blagoveshchensk and Uzhhorod.

First League

Final

References 

USSR Chess Championships
1989 in chess
1989 in Soviet sport